The 1979–80 Western Kentucky Hilltoppers men's basketball team represented Western Kentucky University during the 1979–80 NCAA Division I men's basketball season. The Hilltoppers were members of the Ohio Valley Conference and led by future National Collegiate Basketball Hall of Fame coach Gene Keady.  WKU won the OVC regular season and tournament championships and received the conference's automatic bid to the 1980 NCAA Division I Basketball Tournament.  Craig McCormick and Bill Bryant made the All-OVC Team, and McCormick was selected as OVC Tournament MVP.

Schedule

|-
!colspan=6| Regular season

|-

 

|-
!colspan=6| 1980 Ohio Valley Conference Men's Basketball Tournament

|-
!colspan=6| 1980 NCAA Division I Basketball Tournament

References

Western Kentucky Hilltoppers basketball seasons
Western Kentucky
Western Kentucky
Western Kentucky Basketball, Men's
Western Kentucky Basketball, Men's